The ninth edition of the men's football tournament at the Pan American Games was held in Caracas, Venezuela, from August 15 to August 27, 1983. Ten teams competed in a first round-robin competition, with Brazil defending the title. After the preliminary round there was a semifinal and a final.

Uruguay, coached by Oscar Tabárez, won their first Pan American title after beating Brazil 1–0 in the final.

Qualifying

North America

Original draw 
Originally, the tournament was to have been played by 12 teams organised into four groups of three teams, but Honduras and Suriname withdrew, forcing a rearrangement of the original draw (shown below).
 Group A: Venezuela, Chile, Suriname
 Group B: Brazil, United States, Bermuda
 Group C: Argentina, Guatemala, Honduras
 Group D: Uruguay, Mexico, Cuba

First round

Group A

Group B

Group C

Semifinal
Group B winner (Brazil) received a bye to the final.

Gold-medal match

Awards

Statistics

Goalscorers

Squads

Argentina 
Mario Bernio, Jorge Ceballos, Héctor Cejas, Duilio Dagametti, Esteban Del Río, Gustavo Dezotti, Juan Gilberto Funes, Rodolfo Garnica, Eugenio Gentile, Francisco Guillén (GK), Humberto Gutiérrez, Ariel Moreno, Juan José Oficialdegui, Oscar Olivera, Norberto Ortega Sánchez, Carlos Prono (GK), Esteban Solaberrieta, Jorge Theiler. Head coach: Carlos Pachamé

References

1983
1983
Pan
Pan
Events at the 1983 Pan American Games
1983 in Venezuelan football